Rodney Desborough Slater (born 8 November 1941 in Crowland, Lincolnshire) is a member of the Bonzo Dog Doo-Dah Band, playing saxophones and other musical instruments (particularly winds).

He was a founder member, staying in the band until 1970. Slater appeared with the band when they reformed in 2006 performing with them at various shows over the next few years. He was also active in a side project Three Bonzos and a Piano with fellow Bonzos Roger Ruskin Spear and Sam Spoons as well as keyboard player Dave Glasson, Andy Roberts on guitar and occasionally 'Legs' Larry Smith.

In August 2017 Rodney Slater's Parrots released his debut album Parrotopia!, which contained music, dialogue and recitations. The album contains his first works as a writer.

References

External links
"Bonzo remnants running around", a 1970 Rolling Stone article by Charles Alverson; on Slater immediately after the end of the Bonzos.

1941 births
Living people
English saxophonists
British male saxophonists
British surrealist artists
British comedy musicians
People from Crowland
Bonzo Dog Doo-Dah Band members
21st-century saxophonists
21st-century British male musicians